Olivet is an unincorporated community and census-designated place (CDP) located within Pittsgrove Township, in Salem County, New Jersey, United States. As of the 2010 United States Census, the CDP's population was 1,408.

Geography
According to the United States Census Bureau, Olivet had a total area of 2.701 square miles (6.995 km2), including 2.504 square miles (6.485 km2) of land and 0.197 square miles (0.510 km2) of water (7.29%).

Demographics

Census 2010

Census 2000
As of the 2000 United States Census there were 1,420 people, 460 households, and 419 families living in the CDP. The population density was 220.2/km2 (569.4/mi2). There were 467 housing units at an average density of 72.4/km2 (187.3/mi2). The racial makeup of the CDP was 94.37% White, 1.41% African American, 2.61% Asian, 0.07% Pacific Islander, 0.70% from other races, and 0.85% from two or more races. Hispanic or Latino of any race were 1.41% of the population.

There were 460 households, out of which 51.1% had children under the age of 18 living with them, 80.9% were married couples living together, 7.2% had a female householder with no husband present, and 8.7% were non-families. 7.0% of all households were made up of individuals, and 1.5% had someone living alone who was 65 years of age or older. The average household size was 3.09 and the average family size was 3.23.

In the CDP the population was spread out, with 30.4% under the age of 18, 7.4% from 18 to 24, 26.5% from 25 to 44, 29.8% from 45 to 64, and 5.9% who were 65 years of age or older. The median age was 39 years. For every 100 females, there were 105.8 males. For every 100 females age 18 and over, there were 97.2 males.

The median income for a household in the CDP was $71,893, and the median income for a family was $74,000. Males had a median income of $52,016 versus $28,641 for females. The per capita income for the CDP was $28,981. About 2.5% of families and 3.7% of the population were below the poverty line, including 9.7% of those under age 18 and none of those age 65 or over.

References

Census-designated places in Salem County, New Jersey
Pittsgrove Township, New Jersey